When a Guitar Plays the Blues is a 1985 album by American guitarist and blues musician Roy Buchanan. This was his first record for Alligator Records. It was recorded and mixed by Justin Niebank, mastered by Tom Coyne and produced by Roy Buchanan, Dick Shurman and Bruce Iglauer. All songs were written by Buchanan.

Track listing
All tracks composed by Roy Buchanan, except where noted.
 "When a Guitar Plays the Blues" 
 "Chicago Smokeshop" 
 "Mrs. Pressure" 
 "A Nickel and a Nail" (Deadric Malone, Vernon Morrison)
 "Short Fuse" 
 "Why Don't You Want Me" 
 "Country Boy" 
 "Sneaking Godzilla Through the Alley"
 "Hawaiian Punch"

Personnel
Roy Buchanan – guitar and vocals
Larry Exum – bass guitar  
Morris Jennings – drums 
Bill Heid – keyboards
Steele "Sonny" Seals – saxophone
Criss Johnson – rhythm guitar, solo, (second) (tr.9)
Otis Clay – vocals
Gloria Hardiman – vocals

References

1985 albums
Roy Buchanan albums
Albums produced by Bruce Iglauer
Alligator Records albums